Christian Corleytey Otuteye (born October 23, 1973) is a Ghanaian politician and member of the Seventh Parliament of the Fourth Republic of Ghana representing the Sege constituency in the Greater Accra Region on the ticket of the National Democratic Congress.

Early life and education 
Otuteye was born on October 23, 1973, in Sege, a town in the Greater Accra Region of Ghana. He entered University of Kaiserslautern, Germany and obtained his Master of Science degree in Financial Mathematics in 2004.

Political career 
Otuteye is a member of the National Democratic Congress (NDC). In 2012, he contested for the Sege seat on the ticket of the NDC sixth parliament of the fourth republic and won. In the 2020 Ghanaian elections, he retained the Sege Constituency parliamentary seat.

Personal life 
Otuteye is a Presbyterian. He is married.

Employment 
 Lecturer in Quantitative Maths, Statistics and Research Methods, Ghana Institute of Management and Public Administration, Accra
 Member of Parliament (January 7, 2013–present; 2nd term)

References

Ghanaian MPs 2017–2021
National Democratic Congress (Ghana) politicians
1973 births
Living people
Ghanaian MPs 2021–2025